The Faculty of Law at Saint Petersburg State University is the oldest law school and one of the biggest research centers in Russia.

History
On 22 January 1724, Peter the Great ordered the establishment of the Russian Academy of Sciences and a university where tutors would teach students in theology, jurisprudence, medicine and philosophy. For this purpose Peter invited teachers from Germany. However, from the middle of 18th century the university had been suffering financial difficulties.
That was until 1819, when Alexander I reinstated it. From the very beginning the Faculty of Philosophy and Law was leading: 13 of 24 first students studied there. The university perceived the liberal ideas of 1860s and became a mainstay of free thought, science and art. The Faculty of Law became the biggest at Saint Petersburg University by the end of 19th century (1335 of 2675 students studied there in 1894). The university's and faculty's advancement was stopped by the Revolution of 1905, World War I and the Revolution of 1917. After the Revolution many professors left the country, some of them were expelled.
The university did not have a law faculty from 1930 to 1944. It was re-established after the Siege of Leningrad had been lifted in 1944. After the war the faculty restored its leading positions and now is considered one of the best law faculties in Russia.

During the 19th and 20th centuries such scholars as Friedrich Martens, Leon Petrazycki, Nikolai Tagantsev, Aleksandr Gradovsky, Konstantin Kavelin, Maksim Kovalevsky, Anatoly Koni, and Ilia Zdanevich lectured at the Faculty of Law.

Alexander Blok, Nikolay Gumilev, Leonid Andreyev, Mikhail Zoshchenko, Rainis, Mikhail Vrubel, Sergei Diaghilev, Nicholas Roerich, Igor Stravinsky have attended the Faculty of Law.

Also three prime ministers of Russia, Boris Stürmer, Alexander Kerensky and Dmitriy Medvedev (as well former president), the leader of the Bolsheviks Vladimir Lenin and the current president Vladimir Putin (as well former prime minister) have graduated from the faculty.

Structure
Nowadays the Faculty of Law has ten departments, which include the Department of State and Administrative Law, Department of Civil Law, Department of Civil Procedure, Department of Commercial Law, Department of International Law, Department of Environmental Law, Department of the Theory and History of the State and Law, Department of Labor Law, Department of Criminal Law and Department of Criminal Procedure and Criminalistics.

Notable alumni

Law and Politics
 Vladimir Putin
 Dmitry Medvedev
 Alexander Kerensky
 Alexander Bastrykin
 Anatoly Sobchak
 Mikhail Taube
 Vitaly Mutko
 Dmitry Kozak
 Anton Alexandrovich Ivanov
 Anatoliy Serdyukov
 Pavel Alexandrovich Alexandrov
 Pēteris Stučka
 Alexandr Konovalov
 Konstantin Chuychenko
 Arthur Parfenchikov
 Igor Artemyev
 Nikolay Vinnichenko
 Boris Stürmer
 Vladimir Lenin

Business 
 Herman Gref
 Boris Kovalchuk

Academia 
 Friedrich Martens
 Nikolai Tagantsev
 Włodzimierz Spasowicz

Arts
 Alexander Blok
 Dmitry Kuzmin-Karavayev
 Pyotr Pavlovich Yershov
 Apollon Maykov
 Vasily Polenov
 Mikhail Vrubel
 Rainis
 Alexandre Benois
 Igor Grabar
 Sergei Diaghilev
 Nicholas Roerich
 Ivan Bilibin

See also
 Education in Russia

References

External links
Faculty of Law, Saint Petersburg State University

Saint Petersburg State University
Law schools in Russia
1724 establishments in the Russian Empire
Educational institutions established in 1724